Franco Selvaggi (born 15 May 1953) is an Italian former football player. Born in Pomarico, province of Matera, he was deployed as a striker.

Club career
In his Serie A career (1972–1986), Selvaggi played for Ternana (1972–74), A.S. Roma (1973–74), Cagliari (1979–82), Torino (1982–84), Udinese (1984–85), and Inter (1985–86), also playing with Taranto (1974–79), and ending his career with Sambenedettese (1986–87).

International career
Selvaggi represented the Italy national under-21 football team twice in 1980, scoring 2 goals. With the Italian national team, he earned 3 caps in 1981, making his debut in a 0–0 home draw against East Germany on 19 April. He was a member of the Italy team that won the 1982 World Cup under Enzo Bearzot, but he never played a match in that event.

Style of play
A small, quick, dynamic, mobile, and hardworking centre-forward, he excelled at making attacking runs off the ball, and at playing off his team-mates during build-up plays. He was also capable of holding up the ball for them with his back to goal.

Retirement and managerial career
Following his retirement from playing football, Selvaggi became a football coach.

Honours

International
Italy
FIFA World Cup: 1982

Individual
Medaglia d'Oro al valore atletico: 1982

References

1953 births
Living people
Sportspeople from the Province of Matera
Italian footballers
Italy under-21 international footballers
Italy international footballers
Association football forwards
Serie A players
Serie B players
A.S. Roma players
Cagliari Calcio players
Inter Milan players
Torino F.C. players
A.S. Sambenedettese players
Ternana Calcio players
Udinese Calcio players
Taranto F.C. 1927 players
1982 FIFA World Cup players
FIFA World Cup-winning players
Italian football managers
Footballers from Basilicata
U.S. Catanzaro 1929 managers
Taranto F.C. 1927 managers
F.C. Crotone managers